Ergs or ERGS may refer to:
 Erg, a unit of power
 Electronic Route Guidance System
 Enniskillen Royal Grammar School, in Northern Ireland
 The Ergs!, an American punk band
 Queens' Ergs, an indoor rowing relay race

See also 
 Erg (disambiguation)